Propaganda Troops (abbreviated as ) was a branch of service of the  and the  of Nazi Germany during World War II.

Planning and formation
The planning for propaganda activities by the Wehrmacht began in 1938.  Joseph Goebbels, the head of Ministry of Propaganda, sought to establish effective cooperation with the Wehrmacht to ensure a smooth flow of propaganda materials from the front. He deferred to the military in setting up and controlling the propaganda companies, but provided assistance in supplying personnel.

Function and operation 
The service was subordinated to the OKW Chief of Operation Staff, General Alfred Jodl. Commanded by General Hasso von Wedel, the department oversaw the numerous propaganda companies (Propagandakompanie or PK) of the Wehrmacht and the Waffen-SS, attached to the fighting troops. At its peak in 1942, the propaganda troops included 15,000 men.

The propaganda companies were the only news-reporting units in areas of military operation, as civilian news correspondents were prohibited from entering combat zones. The troops produced the written, audio and film materials from the front and sent them to a processing center in Germany, where they were reviewed by censors, mostly for security purposes. The filtered materials were then forwarded to the Ministry of Propaganda for immediate dissemination. Among the propaganda materials produced was the Wehrmachtbericht, the official news communiqué about the military situation of the Reich, and was intended for both domestic and foreign consumption.

Publications
Propaganda publications in support of the war effort by the Wehrmacht and the Waffen-SS included: 
Die Deutsche Wochenschau – weekly newsreel series
Der Adler – biweekly magazine of the Luftwaffe, the air force
 – propaganda series published under the auspices of Hermann Göring, the head of the Luftwaffe

References

Citations

Bibliography

Further reading
 

Wehrmacht
Military history of Germany during World War II
Radio during World War II
Nazi propaganda organizations